Ambemohar is a fragrant rice variant grown in the foothills of the Western ghats region of the state of Maharashtra in India.

History and etymology 
The word Ambemohar means mango blossom in the Marathi language, which is spoken in the state of Maharashtra where the cultivar originates. The rice has a strong aroma reminiscent of mango blossoms, and has been cultivated in the region for a long time. A century ago about 54,000 tons of the variety was produced in the Mulshi region of  the Pune district.

Production and cultivation 
The variety is grown in the foothills of the Western ghats region of the state of Maharashtra in India. It is a low yielding rice (1.9 ton/ha). The grains are short (5.5 mm) and wide (2.2 mm)  compared to the well known basmati rice. Both varieties have similar degree of fragrance. The variety is therefore included in the class of Aromatic rice such as Basmati. The short cooked grains have a tendency to break easily and stick together.

Related varieties
Ambemohar is low-yielding compared to other varieties of rice, primarily because it is susceptible to diseases. The hybrid called Indrayani with ambemohar parentage was released in 1987. It was developed by Rice Research Centre near Lonavala. Indrayani has also been modified to form new varieties of rice such as Phule Maval and Phule Samrudhi.

Uses

Ambemohar rice is used to prepare a thick soup of rice and milk called ‘Bhatachi
Pej’ locally, mainly for children, elderly people and patients. (Rice Kanji).
The rice is also  used in religious and wedding ceremonies. In Mulshi region of Pune district, it is used for making ‘Vapholya’ - A traditional food item prepared during Makar Sankranti festival. The rice has been used for making soft Idli and crispy dosa. It is also used for  making puffed rice called Kurmure in the Marathi language. The bran from the rice is used for oil extraction or for  Mushroom cultivation.

Geographical indication
Mulshi Taluka sub-division of Pune district in the eastern foothills of the Sahyadri range  has been granted the Geographical Indication for Ambemohar.

Lookalikes 
It is now rare to find farmers who grow Ambemohar regularly. Since the production cost is high, the retail cost in turn has to be high. So, retailers in Maharashtra, pass off lookalikes as original Ambemohar to gain higher profit margins. This has further discouraged the production of Ambemohar, since the farmers can earn more profit themselves by growing lookalikes. Jeera Sambhar rice from Andhra Pradesh and Jawaful from Madhya Pradesh are the most popular lookalikes sold by retailers.

See also 
 Basmati rice
 Jasmine rice
 List of rice varieties
 Oryza sativa
 Wehani rice

References 

Rice varieties
Agriculture in Maharashtra
Rice production in India
Geographical indications in Maharashtra